Ein Strom fließt durch Deutschland is an East German documentary film about the river Elbe. It was directed by Joachim Kunert and released in 1954.

External links
 

1954 films
East German films
1950s German-language films
German documentary films
1954 documentary films
1950s German films